Area theorem may refer to:
 For Hawking's area theorem, see Black hole thermodynamics#The laws of black hole mechanics.
 For the area theorem in conformal mapping theory, see area theorem (conformal mapping).